A partial lunar eclipse will take place on Saturday, 28 October 2023.

Visibility
It will be completely visible over Europe and most of Asia and Africa, will be seen rising over the extreme eastern Americas, and setting over Australia.

Related eclipses

Eclipses of 2023 
 A hybrid solar eclipse on 20 April.
 A penumbral lunar eclipse on 5 May.
 An annular solar eclipse on 14 October.
 A partial lunar eclipse on 28 October.

Lunar year series

Saros series
This eclipse is part of Saros cycle 146.

Metonic series
This eclipse is the last of four Metonic cycle lunar eclipses on the same date, 28–29 October, each separated by 19 years:

Half-Saros cycle
A lunar eclipse will be preceded and followed by solar eclipses by 9 years and 5.5 days (a half saros). This lunar eclipse is related to two partial solar eclipses of Solar Saros 153.

See also
List of lunar eclipses and List of 21st-century lunar eclipses

References

External links
Saros cycle 146

2023-10
2023-10
2023 in science